Silphiodaucus is a genus of flowering plants belonging to the family Apiaceae.

Its native range is Europe to Caucasus.

Species:

Silphiodaucus hispidus 
Silphiodaucus prutenicus

References

Apiaceae
Apiaceae genera